The massif des Cerces is a region of the French Alps on the Franco-Italian border. On the French side it lies in the departements of Hautes-Alpes and Savoie.

The massif consists of smaller mountain chains including Mont Thabor as well as those of the Grand Galibier, Mont Chaberton and the Rois Mages. It is bordered by the massif de la Vanoise to the north, the massif du Mont-Cenis to the north-east, the  Alpes Cottiennes to the east, the massif du Queyras and Écrins to the south and the massif d'Arvan-Villards to the west.

The northernmost end of the range is bordered by the Arc river to the north in the Maurienne valley, and the Guisane river to the south.

Principal peaks

 Grand Galibier, 3229 m
 Roche Bernaude, 3225 m
 Pic du Thabor, 3207 m
 Mont Thabor, 3178 m
 Mont Chaberton, 3136 m
 Pointe des Cerces, 3097 m
 Roche Noire, 3085 m
 Gran Bagna, 3080 m
 Roc Termier, 3078 m
 Pic de la Moulinière, 3073 m
 Cime de la Planette, 3071 m
 Pointe Rochers Charniers, 3063 m
 Punta Nera, 3047 m
 Rochers des Grands Becs, 3044 m
 Le Grand Argentier, 3042 m
 Roche Colombe, 3023 m
 Grand Aréa, 2869 m
 Mont Froid, 2822 m
 Pointe de Bellecombe, 2775 m

Activities

Winter resorts 
 Valloire
 Valmeinier
 Valfréjus

See also
 Valfréjus avalanche, a multiple fatality avalanche in the Massif des Cerces in 2016

Cerces
Cerces
Cerces